Rajmata Jijau is a 2011 Marathi language film based upon the life of Jijabai, mother of the 17th century Maratha king Shivaji, as told in Madan Patil's historical novel Jijausaheb.  The film was directed by Yashwant Bhalkar and produced by Mandatai and Sharadrao Nimse from the studio Jijai Chitra in Shirdi.

Plot
Rajmata Jijau tells the story of Jijabai's life, beginning with the return of the child Shivaji to Pune, and in the process depicts Jijabai as a heroine in her own right, largely responsible for the formation of Shivaji, and therefore, for his accomplishments as founder of the Maratha empire.

Cast
 Smita Deshmukh as Jijabai
 Milind Gunaji as Shahaji
 Amol Kolhe as Shivaji 
 Monika Dabade as Soyarabai 
 Rahul Solapurkar as Afzal Khan
 Rohit kadekar as Sevak
 Deepak Karpe as Netaji Palkar

Production
Rajmata Jijau was produced by the production company Jijai Chitra.  Production began on 6 June 2008 at Raigad with research and pre-production.  Filming began in 2009, and the film was released on 20 May 2011.

Promotion and release

 Rajmata Jijau premiered on 20 May 2011 at Mangala Theatre, Pune, with the entire cast and crew, along with local dignitaries, in attendance.
 Prior to release, the film had been reviewed and promoted in electronic and print media.
 Released at Belgaum and Vijapur (Karnataka state)

Reception

Loksatta published separated reviews of the film and its soundtrack, giving favorable notice to the Powar's score.  The film was also reviewed by the IBN Lokmat and Star Majha news channels and Lokmat, Sakal, and Pudhari newspapers.

International appearances
Rajmata Jijau was released in United Kingdom at the Paul Robeson Theater in London on 20 August 2011, making it the first-ever Marathi language film released in the UK.

The film screened at Pune International Film Festival on 16 January 2012.

Awards

 Marathi VishwaRatna (November 2011) to producers Mandatai and Sharadrao Nimse
 Jijau KalaRatna (January 2012) to Smita Deshmukh
 Best Costume Maharashtra State Film Awards(April 2012) to Purnima Oak.
  Nominated for Best Actress Maharashtra State Film Awards (April 2012) to Dr.Smita Deshmukh

Soundtrack
Lyricist Babasaheb Saudagar and music director Shashank Powar created the soundtrack for Rajmata Jijau.  Since this is a period film, Powar researched 16th and 17th century Marathi music to create the score.  The soundtrack was released as an album (Rajmata Jijau Shourya Geete) in April 2011.

Tracks
 "Bhagvya Zendyachya Sansarala" (Gondhal)- (Shankar Mahadevan and chorus)
 "Dhar Sonyacha Nangar Haati"- (Suresh Wadkar and chorus)
 "Jay Jay Jijau" (Title Track)- (Kailash Kher and chorus)
 "Ala Ala Shivaji" (Powada)- (Nandesh Umap and chorus)

References

External links
 

Indian biographical films
History of India on film
Cultural depictions of Shivaji
Films set in Maharashtra
Films set in the Maratha Empire
2010s biographical films
2010s Marathi-language films